USS Constance II (SP-633), later USS YP-633, was a United States Navy patrol vessel in commission from 1917 to 1922.

Constance II was built as a private motorboat of the same name by the Holmes Motor Boat Company at West Mystic, Connecticut, in 1914. On 6 July 1917, the U.S. Navy acquired her from her owner, Joseph Gahm of Boston, Massachusetts, for use as a section patrol boat during World War I. She was commissioned as USS Constance II (SP-633) on 30 July 1917.

Assigned to the 1st Naval District in northern New England, Constance II performed patrol duty in the naval district for the next five years. When the U.S. Navy adopted its modern hull number system on 17 July 1920, Constance II was reclassified as "district patrol craft", redesignated YP-633, and renamed USS YP-633.

YP-633 was stricken from the naval districts list of district craft on 5 September 1922. Reclassified as a "small boat," she was reassigned to the Boston Navy Yard at Boston for use as a non-commissioned launch, in which capacity she served for some time thereafter.

References

Department of the Navy Naval History and Heritage Command Online Library of Selected Images: Civilian Ships: Constance II (American Motor Boat, 1914). Became USS Constance II (SP-633) in 1917 and YP-633 in 1920.
NavSource Online: Section Patrol Craft Photo Archive YP-633 ex-Constance II (SP 633)

Patrol vessels of the United States Navy
World War I patrol vessels of the United States
Ships built in Mystic, Connecticut
1914 ships